The Etz Hayyim Synagogue is an Orthodox Jewish synagogue in Chania on the Greek island of Crete. It is the only surviving remnant of the island's Romaniote Jewish community.

Overview
After being restored, the synagogue (with its mikveh) has become a tourist destination and has attracted visits from foreign dignitaries like Queen Sofía of Spain and King Constantine II of Greece, who made a sudden and unannounced visit to the site in March 2006.

Today, the synagogue is seen locally as a symbol of coexistence. Uniquely, almost all of its congregants are non-Jews, with an international team taking care of the congregation work. Occasionally, a rabbi or (during the Jewish holidays) someone who is able to blow the shofar visits the community. Christians and Muslims are invited to visit. Despite the community's Romaniote past, the congregation today uses primarily the Sephardic custom of Greece and has developed its own Haggadah text.

The synagogue was the target of multiple arson attacks in January 2010; fires were set inside the synagogue on 5 and 16 January, and a bar of soap was left outside during the latter, presumably invoking a common Greek-language antisemitic threat which translates to "I'll make you into a bar of soap". The first fire was quickly contained, but the second destroyed 2,500 rare books and manuscripts. Two British men aged 23 and 33, and one Greek man aged 24, were arrested in connection with both attacks after the Greek man confessed to police. Two Americans were also being sought by police in connection with the first attack.

See also
Etz Chaim Synagogue (Athens)

References

External links
 
 

21st-century attacks on synagogues and Jewish communal organizations
Buildings and structures in Chania
Orthodox Judaism in Europe
Orthodox synagogues
Romaniote synagogues
Religious buildings and structures in Crete
Romaniote Jews topics
Sephardi Jewish culture in Greece
Synagogues in Greece
Tourist attractions in Crete